MagicJack is an Internet-based telephone service (VoIP) provider in the United States and Canada. It offers nationwide VoIP and cellphone services.

MagicJack VOIP service is a computer peripheral that, in combination with telephony service from the related YMAX Corporation, provides VoIP services. In 2011 the company introduced MagicJack Plus, which no longer requires a computer (but still requires the user to have an Internet service provider).

The MagicJack device works exclusively with the company's captive landline supplier and competitive local exchange carrier, YMAX. Voicemail is stored on the MagicJack servers and is delivered via direct telephone access, and email with WAV audio file attachments. Downloadable feature upgrades for the MagicJack USB dongle are available from third-party software companies.

History
Dan Borislow invented the product in 2007 and had applied for patents from the U.S. government while he and Donald Burns shared the payment of $25 million to start up the company.

The firm's first product, introduced in 2007, is a USB device that has both the software necessary to place Internet-based telephone calls via a customer-supplied high-speed Internet connection and the electronics (technically known as a subscriber line interface circuit) which allow conventional landline telephones to be plugged directly into the device.

In September 2011, the company introduced MagicJack Plus, which does not require the use of a computer after its initial online registration and account set-up procedure. The device connects directly to a modem or router's ethernet port and has a standard phone jack (which allows a phone to be connected to the device) as well as an AC power adapter that plugs into a standard U.S. electrical outlet.

The products are promoted through television infomercials and a website. The company's website attributes the invention of MagicJack and the founding of YMAX to Dan Borislow, who has numerous patent claims pending on voice-over-IP (VoIP)-related technology.

In July 2010, YMAX (the creator/owner of MagicJack) merged with VocalTec to form MagicJack VocalTec Ltd which is headquartered in Netanya, Israel.

Reviews
In January 2008, PC Magazine reviewed MagicJack and rated it as Very Good. It also received their Editors' Choice award. In February 2009, PC Magazine re-reviewed magicJack because of dozens of complaints received about the support for the device. As a result, PC Magazine reduced its rating of MagicJack from Very Good to Good, saying the company's technical support was "severely lacking." The company offers support via web-based chat.

In 2010, Consumer Reports gave MagicJack a thumbs up.

In 2016, TheVoIPHub released the most comprehensive review of MagicJack seen to date, including information on every device they have ever released.

In 2016, CNET said that MagicJack is a “trade-off between price and reliability."

In 2019, Voip Review showed MagicJack with 1.6 star rating, down from 3 stars in 2014.

As of November 2019, Consumer Affairs had given MagicJack a 1 star rating.

Features

Local number portability
In September 2011 MagicJack began offering local number portability, with an annual fee to keep the "ported-in" number. This allows customers to keep their existing phone numbers when switching to MagicJack. The company charges its customers to transfer their telephone number out of their MagicJack telephone service into a different telephone service provider. Not all US area codes are available.

Calling pay services 
According to their end-user license agreement:

3.b Outgoing Calls:
"Once you have registered your MagicJack device you have agreed to these Terms of Service. You may now elect to choose the feature allowing you to make free outgoing calls over the Internet. You can make free calls to other MagicJack device users located anywhere in the world, and to subscribers on traditional telephone networks or wireless networks in the United States. You will not have the ability to call any number that would require the addition of any charges to your phone bill, such as 900 or 976 numbers or any other 'fee per call' type service."

Not all calls in North America are free 
A separate prepaid minutes purchase is required for calls to conference lines, platforms, calling cards, certain non-ILEC area calls, area code 867 (Northern Canada), and most of Alaska.

According to MagicJack's end-user license agreement:

4. What Is Free and What is Not:
"We may require prepaid purchase and/or we may charge you for calls to conference lines, platforms, and certain non-ILEC area calls, or any call wherein we incur a cost from another carrier. We may provide for a fee, premium prepaid services, which may be powered by YMAX Communications Corp. (YMAX) and may include some inbound, international, conference, platform, and outbound calls that receive a recording and certain calls to non-ILEC areas, and the rates for those services will be governed by listed price lists or tariffs.  International calling purchases expire six months after purchase.  MagicJack, YMAX Communications Corp. (YMAX), and/or Vocal Tec may make available to you, for an additional fee, enhanced versions of the MagicJack and/or MagicJack Plus device or M″agicJack APP Software (Upgraded Software) that provide new features and functions."

Uninstallation 
Originally MagicJack did not provide an uninstallation method in either the software or the documentation, causing a lot of users to get very upset with the company. As a result, since 2010, the version for the Windows platform has had an uninstaller accessible through the "Add/Remove Programs" in the Windows Control Panel.

Lawsuits
1. In March 2009, MagicJack took legal action for defamation against Boing Boing over its assessment of MagicJack's terms of service, which included assertions that the MagicJack end-user license agreement allows the company to "snoop" on users by analyzing their calls for the purpose of targeting advertising and that the agreement also requires users to waive the right to sue in court. MagicJack's suit was determined to be a strategic lawsuit against public participation and was dismissed. MagicJack was also ordered to pay Boing Boing's legal expenses of $50,000 US.

2. MagicJack sued netTalk in April 2012 for patent infringement. The federal court has dismissed the entire case with prejudice, including all claims, counterclaims, defenses and causes of action.

3. On September 21, 2012, NetTalk.com, filed a complaint in United States District Court For the Southern District of Florida, Civil Action No.: 9:12-cv-81022-Civ-Middlebrook/Brannon, against MagicJack Vocaltec, MagicJack Holdings f/k/a YMAX Holdings and Daniel Borislow. In the complaint, netTalk alleged patent infringement by the defendants, seeking injunctive relief and damages of two hundred million dollars ($200,000,000) as a result of the alleged patent infringement by defendants. As a result of this action, MagicJack/Vocaltec filed a document with the United States Patent Office requesting reexamination of netTalk patent 8,243,722. The Patent Office granted the reexamination petition and the claim against MagicJack/Vocaltec was stayed pending its outcome. In December 2013 netTalk received a Patent Office Notice of Intent to Issue Ex Parte Reexamination Certificate for netTalk’s U.S. Patent Number 8,243,722. In January 2014, netTalk petitioned the courts to restart the aforementioned lawsuit against MagicJack Vocaltec, MagicJack Holdings f/k/a YMAX Hodings and Daniel Borislow. February 4, 2014, MagicJack announced the dismissal of the lawsuit.

4. On February 27, 2014, netTalk received the reexamination certificate which restated that all three claims of the ‘722 patent were allowable.  The three claims were minimally amended during the proceeding.

5. On April 2, 2014 Daniel Borislow and Technochat sued MagicJack VocalTec and YMAX for defamation, fraudulent inducement and many other allegations. In December 2014, the case was settled out of court by Daniel Borislow's widow.

6. On August 31, 2017 Finkelstein & Krinsk, LLP has filed a class action lawsuit against MagicJack on behalf of the MagicJack shareholders who were deprived of fair Proxy materials content and shareholder voting concerning the April 19, 2017 and July 31, 2017 proxy solicitations.

7. July 12, 2018 Ramon Martinez and Moses Lopez filed suit against MagicJack for Robocalls made with a predictive dialer without human intervention.

8. Galilee Acquisition filed a lawsuit against MagicJack on July 25, 2018 and seeks damages suggesting MagicJack provided bad filing information on the fair market value of Broadsmart telecommunications.  "Ultimately, the court dismissed his lawsuit because his claims were derivative in nature and he failed to plead that he made a demand on magicJack or that doing so would have been futile."

See also
Voice over IP

References

External links

 Official website
 YMAX Corporation Web site

VoIP hardware
Products introduced in 2007